Adamant is the third studio album by German rock band Stahlmann, released in 2013.

The album reached number 34 on the Official German Charts in May 2013.

Track listing

References 

2013 albums
Stahlmann albums